Quintana de Fon is a locality and minor local entity located in the municipality of Villamejil, in León province, Castile and León, Spain. As of 2020, it has a population of 35.

Geography 
Quintana de Fon is located 56km west of León.

References

Populated places in the Province of León